Pretend City Children’s Museum is a nonprofit children’s museum in Irvine, CA. The museum features 17 interactive exhibits designed as a small, interconnected city. Pretend City aims to “build better brains” through purposeful play, hands-on learning experiences, role playing, and educational programming. In addition, the museum offers community resources such as developmental screenings and tools for families, educators and community agencies.

History 

Pretend City Children’s Museum was founded by Alexandra Airth and Sandra Peffer. Its first educational program was a mobile field trip experience in 2007 called “Pretend City on Wheels.” In July 2009, Pretend City launched a 10-year countywide program designed to educate the community, parents and care givers about the importance of regular developmental screenings for children, specifically infants to age five. On August 30, 2009, Pretend City opened. In November 2010, the museum was awarded “The Possible Dream” grant by The Festival of Children Foundation and OC Register, which funded autism programs and enabled Pretend City to hold two events a month for those affected by autism, such as creative relaxation classes, family autism day, and an autism workshop.

Exhibits and Special Programs 
Pretend City’s kid-sized environment includes exhibits modeled after the different facets of a city. Children are offered employee timecards and encouraged to punch in at different work stations where they can get paid with Pretend City cash. The exhibits include an Amphitheater, Art Studio, Mind + Body Center, Sandy Beach, Restaurant Café, City Hall and Lobby, Construction Site, Emergency Services with Dispatch Station, Police Station, and Fire Station, Farm, Gas Station, Trader Joe's Grocery Store, Health Center with Doctor’s and Dental Office, Marina, Orange Plaza, Our Home, and UPS Store. Pretend City is also home to the Imagination Playground, which is a playground equipment system designed by David Rockwell.

In addition to its exhibits, Pretend City offers educational field trips and classes.

Notes

Pretend City Re-Opens, ABC7 
Pretend City reopens Saturday with new exhibits, pandemic lessons learned, OC Register 
Pretend City locals invest in youngest citizens, LA Times

Museums in Orange County, California
Children's museums in California
Buildings and structures in Irvine, California
Tourist attractions in Irvine, California